The Cattle Market Street drill hall is a former military installation in Norwich, United Kingdom.

History
The building, which dates from the early 20th century, became the headquarters of the Norfolk (The King's Own Royal Regiment) Yeomanry at around that time and of the 6th (Cyclist) Battalion, the Norfolk Regiment in about 1910. The 6th Battalion was mobilised at St Giles before being deployed to Ireland and was subsequently disbanded in 1921. Meanwhile, in 1922, the Norfolk Yeomany converted to become the 108th (Suffolk and Norfolk Yeomanry) Field Brigade, Royal Artillery with its headquarters at the Sporle Road drill hall in Swaffham but with 429 (Norfolk Yeomanry) Battery, which was initially based at Swaffham, returning to the Cattle Market Street drill hall a few years later. Following amalgamations during the Second World War, the drill hall was decommissioned and the premises are now used as offices by a firm of architects.

References

Sources
 

Buildings and structures in Norwich
Drill halls in England